Kamyshlinka (Qamışlı) is a rural locality (a selo) and the administrative centre of Kamyshlinsky Selsoviet, Karmaskalinsky District, Bashkortostan, Russia. The population was 417 as of 2010. There are 5 streets.

Geography 
Kamyshlinka is located 21 km southeast of Karmaskaly (the district's administrative centre) by road. Dmitriyevka is the nearest rural locality.

References 

Rural localities in Karmaskalinsky District